Charles Diodore Rahoult (2 December 1819, Grenoble - 23 March 1874, Grenoble) was a French painter of landscapes and genre scenes.

Life and work 

He was born into a family of merchants, and his father was a confectioner. He showed an early aptitude for art and studied with Horace Mollard (1800-1872), a local landscape painter. When he had mastered the basics, he went to Paris to become a student of Léon Cogniet; accompanied by his friend, Henri Blanc-Fontaine, who he had convinced to abandon a legal career, in favor of painting. After visiting Rome and Naples, he returned to Grenoble in 1847.

The following year, he exhibited at the Salon there, as well as the one in Lyon. In 1852, he was commissioned to create decorative works in the Chapel of the Virgin at the Collegiate Church of Saint-André.

Shortly after, he and his friend, Blanc-Fontaine, were commissioned to create allegorical paintings at the new : those on Poetry, History and Geometry in the vestibule, and those on Theology, Astronomy, Mechanics, Legislation and Philosophy in the main library. At that time, he became associated with a group of artists who met at Proveysieux.

He died of a stroke at the age of fifty-three, and was interred at Saint Roch Cemetery.

His works may be seen at the Musée de Grenoble and the Musée de la Révolution française. In 2013, the Musée de l'Ancien Évêché, and the Bibliothèque municipale de Grenoble, organized a joint retrospective of his works.

References

Further reading 
 Nathalie Servonnat-Favier, Peintre(s) à Proveysieux (exhibition catalogue), Musée de l'Ancien Évêché, Grenoble, 2003, 
 Maurice Wantellet, Deux Siècles et Plus de Peinture Dauphinoise, self-published, 1987 
 Various authors, Diodore Rahoult. Paroles de palette (exhibition catalogue), Conseil général de l'Isère/Musée de l'ancien évêché/Bibliothèques municipales,

External links 

 More works by Rahoult @ ArtNet

1819 births
1874 deaths
19th-century French painters
French genre painters
French landscape painters
French decorative artists
Artists from Grenoble